The 2010 FIM PGE Polska Grupa Energetyczna Speedway World Cup Final was the fourth and the final race of the 2010 Speedway World Cup season. The event took place on August 1, 2010, at the Speedway Center in Vojens, Denmark.

The race was initially scheduled for July 31; it was cancelled after Heat 4, however, when the track was deemed unsuitable by the FIM Jury due to adverse weather conditions. The race was re-staged on the next day at 3pm.

Results

Heat details

Day 1 (canceled) 
 Holta, Lindgren, Harris, Bjerre
 Davidsson, Hampel, Woffinden, Klindt
 Lindbäck, Stead, Iversen, Gollob
 Pedersen, Nicholls, Zetterström, Miedziński
Standings:
  - 9 pts
  - 6 pts
  - 5 pts
  - 4 pts

Day 2 

The declared teams for the event were announced after practice on July 30, 2010.

See also 
 2010 Speedway World Cup
 motorcycle speedway

References 

!